Larson is a Scandinavian patronymic surname meaning "son of Lars". "Lars" is derived from the Roman name "Laurentius", which means "from Laurentum" or "crowned with laurel." There are various spellings.  As a surname (last name), Larson may refer to:

People

Science and mathematics

 Edward Larson, American historian
 Gustav Larson, Swedish engineer, co-founder of Volvo
 Lawrence Larson, American engineer
 Paul Larson, American computer scientist
 Richard Larson, American professor and operations researcher
 Ron Larson, American mathematician, author

Television and film

 Bob Larson, television evangelist
 Brie Larson, American actress and pop singer
 Chad Larson, member of the Aquabats
 Charles Larson, American TV writer and producer
 Eric Larson, animator for the Walt Disney Studios
 Glen A. Larson, television writer and producer
 Jack Larson, American actor, screenwriter and producer
 Jill Larson, American actress
 Lisby Larson, American actress
 Michael Larson, game show contestant
 Ron Larson, art director, album cover designer, graphic artist
 Wolf Larson, Canadian actor

Art and literature

 Erik Larson, American author
 Gary Larson, American cartoonist, author of The Far Side
 Hope Larson, freelance illustrator, cartoonist
 Kate Larson (disambiguation), multiple people
 Kent Larson, American architect, author, academic (MIT Media Lab)
 Kirby Larson, author of children's books
 Laura Larson, photographer and artist
 Lisa Larson, Swedish ceramicist

Music

 Chad Larson, American bass guitarist and actor (The Aquabats)
 Jonathan Larson, American composer
 Nathan Larson, American composer, musician
 Nicolette Larson, American singer

Sports
 Ben Larson, American former college basketball player
 Dan Larson, former Major League Baseball pitcher
 David Larson former swimmer for the United States
 Gary Larson, Australian rugby league player
 Jordan Larson, American volleyball player
 Jud Larson, American Formula One driver
 Kyle Larson (American football), former punter for the Cincinnati Bengals
 Kyle Larson, American racing driver
 Lance Larson, American swimmer, Olympic champion 
 Lynae Larson, American marathon runner
 Mattie Larson, American gymnast, World silver medalist
 Paul Larson (American football), former quarterback for the Oakland Raiders
 Reed Larson, ice hockey defenseman, former captain of the Detroit Red Wings

Politics and law
 Cal Larson, former Minnesota state senator
 Chuck Larson, former Iowa state senator
 Colin Larson, state representative from Colorado
 Edwin J. Larson (1885–1949), former Wisconsin state assemblyman
 Grant Larson, Wyoming state senator
 James Larson (1855–1923), former Wisconsin state assemblyman
 Jerry L. Larson (1936-2018), former Iowa Supreme Court justice
 Jess Larson (1904–1987), first Administrator of U.S. General Services
 John B. Larson, current U.S. Representative from Connecticut
 Morgan Foster Larson, 40th Governor of New Jersey
 Nathan Larson (politician), political candidate from Virginia
 Nels Larson, former Wisconsin state assemblyman
 Norman J. Larson, former Minnesota state senator
 Oscar John Larson, former U.S. Representative from Minnesota
 Thomas Larson (disambiguation), multiple people

Military
 August Larson (1904–1981), U.S. Marine Corps major general
 Charles R. Larson, United States Navy admiral
 Doyle E. Larson (1930–2007), U.S. Air Force major general
 Duane S. Larson (1916–2005), North Dakota Air National Guard brigadier general
 Everett F. Larson (1920–1942), United States Marine and Silver Star recipient
 Jess Larson (1904–1987), U.S. Air Force Reserve major general
 John David Larson (fl. 1960s–1990s), U.S. National Guard brigadier general
 Westside T. Larson (1892–1977), U.S. Air Force major general

Fictional characters
 Dr. Larson, in the animated television series Darkwing Duck
 Vicki Larson, in the situation comedy Full House

See also
 General Larson (disambiguation)
 Justice Larson (disambiguation)
 Senator Larson (disambiguation)
 Larsen
 Larssen
 Larsson

References

Patronymic surnames